In the Earth sciences, aggregate has three possible meanings.

In mineralogy and petrology, an aggregate is a mass of mineral crystals, mineraloid particles or rock particles. Examples are dolomite, which is an aggregate of crystals of the mineral dolomite, and rock gypsum, an aggregate of crystals of the mineral gypsum. Lapis lazuli is a type of rock composed of an aggregate of crystals of many minerals including lazurite, pyrite, phlogopite, calcite, potassium feldspar, wollastonite and some sodalite group minerals.

In  the construction industry, an aggregate (often referred to as a construction aggregate) is sand, gravel or crushed rock that has been mined or quarried for use as a building material.

In pedology, an aggregate is a mass of soil particles. If the aggregate has formed naturally, it can be called a ped; if formed artificially, it can be called a clod.

Construction aggregate examples

 basalt

 dolomite
 granite
 gravel
 limestone
 sand
 sandstone

Use in industry

Aggregates are used extensively in the construction industry Often in making concrete, a construction aggregate is used,
with about 6 billion tons of concrete produced per year.

See also
 Interfacial Transition Zone (ITZ)
 Soil structure

References

External links
 What are aggregates? 
 Concrete Aggregates — Geological Considerations
 What is aggregate? — The Bare Essentials of Concrete — Part 2 YouTube video (duration 4 minutes)

Industrial minerals
Mineralogy
Pedology
Petrology